Ali Hallab (born 4 April 1981 in Mantes-la-Jolie, Yvelines) is a French former professional boxer who competed from 2009 to 2013, holding the WBO European super bantamweight title from 2012 to 2013. As an amateur, he won the bronze medal at the 2005 World Championships.

Career
Hallab participated in the 2004 Summer Olympics for his native European country. There he was stopped in the first round of the Bantamweight (54 kg) division by Algeria's Malik Bouziane.

Hallab won the bronze medal at the 2002 European Amateur Boxing Championships, and won the silver medal in the same division at the 2004 European Amateur Boxing Championships in Pula, Croatia. He later won the bronze medal at the 2005 World Amateur Boxing Championships.

At the 2007 World Amateur Boxing Championships he lost to local hero Gary Russell (boxer).

At the 2008 Beijing Olympics he lost to Indian Akhil Kumar 12-5.

Professional boxing record

References
 
 Yahoo! Sports

External links 
 
 

1981 births
Living people
People from Mantes-la-Jolie
Bantamweight boxers
Boxers at the 2004 Summer Olympics
Boxers at the 2008 Summer Olympics
Olympic boxers of France
French people of Lebanese descent
Sportspeople of Lebanese descent
French male boxers
AIBA World Boxing Championships medalists
Mediterranean Games gold medalists for France
Competitors at the 2005 Mediterranean Games
Sportspeople from Yvelines
Mediterranean Games medalists in boxing